Alloteropsis (from the Greek allotrios ("strange") and opsis ("appearance")) is a genus of Old World plants in the grass family.

The group is widely distributed in tropical and subtropical parts of Africa, Asia and Australia, as well as on certain islands in the Indian and Pacific Oceans. The genus is unusual among plants in that it includes species with both C3 and C4 photosynthetic pathways, and ongoing research is investigating these taxa as a case study in how carbon concentrating mechanisms for photosynthesis evolve in land plants.

Photosynthetic pathway evolution

Most of the species of Alloteropsis use variants of the C4 photosynthetic pathway, but A. semialata ssp. eckloniana uses the C3 photosynthetic pathway. Phylogenetic reconstructions of the evolutionary relationships between these species have led to two hypotheses about how photosynthetic pathways have evolved within the group. First, C4 photosynthesis evolved in three lineages within this group, leading to independently derived realisations of this pathway (the hypothesis of multiple C4 origins). Secondly, that there was a single origin of C4 photosynthesis within the genus, and the C3 taxon, A. s. ecklonia, was subsequently derived from a C4 ancestor (the reversion hypothesis). Since C4 photosynthesis is a complex trait, its evolution followed by a reversion to the ancestral type of C3 photosynthesis would represent an exception to Dollo's law.

The reversion hypothesis is the most parsimonious explanation of phylogenetic relationships within Alloteropsis. However, direct evidence for the hypothesis, in the form of C4 genes or pseudogenes in the C3 taxon, is currently lacking. Instead, two pieces of evidence better support the hypothesis of multiple C4 origins. First, different variants of  C4 leaf anatomy are found in three different Alloteropsis lineages. Secondly, key C4 enzymes (PEPC and PEPCK) were recruited multiple times to function in C4 biochemistry across independent lineages.

C4 photosynthetic pathway evolution in Alloteropsis also represents an example of adaptive evolution via horizontal gene transfer in eukaryotes. It is the first such example of gene transfer between plant species that are not in direct physical contact (as in a host-parasite relationship). In each case, genes adapted for an important function in C4 photosynthesis have been transferred from grass lineages that diverged from Alloteropsis more than 20 million years ago, and independently evolved C4 photosynthesis. Horizontally inherited genes encode the photosynthesis enzymes PEPC and PEPCK. All other genes expressed in the mature C4 leaf of A. s. semialata were vertically inherited from a common ancestor with the C3 taxon A. s. eckloniana.

Diversity

 Accepted species
 Alloteropsis angusta Stapf  - Nigeria, Cameroon, Zaire, Kenya, Uganda, Zambia, Angola
 Alloteropsis cimicina (L.) Stapf - sub-Saharan Africa, Indian Subcontinent, Madagascar, Hainan, Southeast Asia, northern Australia; sparingly naturalized in scattered locations in the United States (Mississippi, Florida, Maryland).
 Alloteropsis paniculata (Benth.) Stapf  - tropical Africa, Madagascar, Mauritius, Réunion
 Alloteropsis papillosa Clayton - Kenya, Tanzania, Mozambique, Limpopo, Mpumalanga, KwaZulu-Natal
 Alloteropsis semialata (R.Br.) Hitchc. - sub-Saharan Africa, Indian Subcontinent, Madagascar, China, Southeast Asia, northern Australia, New Guinea,  Solomon Islands, New Caledonia

 Formerly included
see Mayariochloa Scutachne 
 Alloteropsis amphistemon - Mayariochloa amphistemon 
 Alloteropsis dura - Scutachne dura

See also
 List of Poaceae genera

References

External links
 Grassbase - The World Online Grass Flora

Poaceae genera
Panicoideae